The following events related to sociology occurred in the 1890s.

1890
Sir James George Frazer's The Golden Bough is published.
Alfred Marshall's Principles of Economics is published.
Jose Rizal's La Indolencia de los Filipinos is published in Madrid.
Georg Simmel's Social Differentiation is published.
Gabriel Tarde's Laws of Imitation is published.
Frank Wilson Blackmar starts teaching Elements of Sociology to graduate students at the University of Kansas, Lawrence. This becomes the oldest continuing sociology course in America

Births
March 8: Oswald von Nell-Breuning

1891
The Department of History and Sociology is established at the University of Kansas
Beatrice Webb's Co-operative Movement is published.
Edward Alexander Westermarck's The History of Human Marriage is published.

1892
Albion Small establishes the 1st Department of Sociology The Chicago School of Sociology.
Charlotte Perkins Gilman's The Yellow Wallpaper is published.
Georg Simmel's Problems of the Philosophy of History is published.

1893
Émile Durkheim's The Division of Labour in Society is published.
Leonard Trelawny Hobhouse's The Labour Movement is published.
The final volume of Karl Marx's Capital is published (edited by Engels).
Georg Simmel's Introduction to the Science of Ethics is published.
Wilhelm Windelband's A History of Philosophy is published.
Rene Worms founded the small Institut International de Sociologie

1894
Albion Woodbury Small writes the 1st textbook in Sociology: An introduction to the study of the society
W. E. B. Du Bois' The Philadelphia Negro is published.

1895
Émile Durkheim's On the Normality of Crime is published.
Émile Durkheim's The Rules of the Sociological Method is published.
The first publication of The American Journal of Sociology by The University of Chicago Press

1896
Henri Bergson's Matter and Memory is published.
Franklin Henry Giddings' Principles of Sociology is published.
Gaetano Mosca's The Ruling Class is published.
Rene Worms' The Nature and Method of Sociology is published.

1897
W. E. B. Du Bois' The Souls of Black Folk is published.
Émile Durkheim's Suicide is published.
Vilfredo Pareto's The New Theories of Economics is published.
The First publication of L'Année Sociologique.

Births
May 22: Stanislaw Ossowski
June 22: Norbert Elias
August 28: Louis Wirth

1898
Franklin Henry Giddings' Elements of Sociology is published.
Gabriel Tarde's Social Laws: An Outline of Sociology is published.
Charlotte Perkins Gilman's Women and Economics is published.

1899
Karl Kautsky's On The Agrarian Question is published.
Vladimir Ilyich Ulyanov Lenin's The Development of Capitalism in Russia is published.
Thorstein Bunde Veblen's of The Theory of the Leisure Class is published.

Sociology
Sociology timelines
1890s decade overviews